The Chimera is a 1721 comedy play by the British writer Thomas Odell.

The original Lincoln's Inn Fields cast included Anthony Boheme as Lord Gracebubble, William Bullock as Selfroth, Christopher Bullock as Ninnyhammer, George Pack as Teartext and Anna Maria Seymour as Lady Meanwell.

References

Bibliography
 Burling, William J. A Checklist of New Plays and Entertainments on the London Stage, 1700-1737. Fairleigh Dickinson Univ Press, 1992.
 Nicoll, Allardyce. A History of Early Eighteenth Century Drama: 1700-1750. CUP Archive, 1927.

1721 plays
Plays by Thomas Odell
West End plays
Comedy plays